The 40th Walker Cup Match was played on August 13 and 14, 2005 at the Chicago Golf Club in Wheaton, Illinois, United States. Team United States won 12½ to 11½.

Format
The format for play on Saturday and Sunday are the same. There are four matches of foursomes in the morning and eight singles matches in the afternoon. In all, 24 matches are played. Each of the 24 matches is worth one point in the larger team competition. If a match is all square after the 18th hole extra holes are not played. Rather, each side earns ½ a point toward their team total. The team that accumulates at least 12½ points wins the competition.

Teams

Team Great Britain & Ireland
 & 
Captain:  Garth McGimpsey
 Rhys Davies
 Robert Dinwiddie
 Nigel Edwards
 Oliver Fisher
 Gary Lockerbie
 Brian McElhinney
 Richie Ramsay
 Matthew Richardson
 Lloyd Saltman
 Gary Wolstenholme

Team United States

Captain: Bob Lewis
Matt Every
Anthony Kim
Brian Harman
J. B. Holmes
Billy Hurley III
Jeff Overton
Michael Putnam
Kyle Reifers
Nicholas Thompson
Lee Williams

Saturday's matches

Morning foursomes

Afternoon singles

Sunday's matches

Morning foursomes

Afternoon singles

Venue
The Chicago Golf Club in Wheaton, Illinois is a par 70 course with a yardage of 6,782. World Golf Hall of Fame member Charles B. Macdonald is credited with designing the track. The course opened for play in 1894. In 1922, famed architect Seth Raynor made some revisions to the course. Chicago Golf Club has hosted various USGA events, including the 1897, 1900 and 1911 U.S. Open.

External links
Official site
http://www.walkercuphistory.com  - definitive site containing complete history and statistics (paid subscription site).

Walker Cup
Golf in Illinois
Wheaton, Illinois
Walker Cup
Walker Cup
Walker Cup
Walker Cup